Helena Grace Foulkes (née Buonanno; born July 18, 1964) is an American businesswoman and politician. She unsuccessfully sought the Democratic nomination for Governor of Rhode Island in the 2022 election and is the former Chief Executive Officer of Hudson's Bay Company.

Early life and education
The daughter of a lawyer, Helena Buonanno was born the eldest of five children. She grew up in Rhode Island and attended Lincoln School in Providence. She earned her Bachelor of Arts from Harvard College, graduating magna cum laude; there she met her husband, marrying him in 1989 in a Roman Catholic ceremony. Larry Summers was her senior thesis adviser. She later earned her Master of Business Administration from Harvard Business School.

Career
After graduating from Harvard, Foulkes briefly worked at Goldman Sachs and Tiffany & Co before leaving to earn her MBA. She began working at CVS in 1992. She rose to become the company's executive vice president and chief marketing officer. She oversaw the launch of the ExtraCare card, a membership program offering savings to participants. Foulkes also created the Pharmacy Advisor program, its purpose being to offer advice to customers with chronic conditions, either in stores or over the phone.

In 2011, CVS made Foulkes its chief health care strategy and marketing officer, a new position created for her. In July 2015, Fortune magazine reported that as part of her role, Foulkes oversaw 9,600 retail stores and 18 distribution centers. She helped spur the decision to stop selling cigarettes and tobacco products, citing the need for CVS to better position itself as a healthcare company. She oversaw the company's philanthropic endeavors, and developed digital strategies to help consumers learn how to fulfill their pharmaceutical needs.

In 2015, Fortune magazine included her on its list of Most Powerful Women, citing Foulkes' role in the "$1.9 billion purchase of Target's prescription-filling business—a deal that will give CVS the most pharmacy locations in the U.S.—and launching upgraded beauty and healthy food sections in many of the stores".

On February 5, 2018, Hudson's Bay Co., owner of Saks Fifth Avenue, named Foulkes its new CEO, saying it would be effective on February 19. In her first six weeks as CEO, Foulkes was challenged with refashioning the company's business strategies given the industry's declining sales at the time.

In March 2020, Foulkes announced that she was leaving Hudson's Bay Co. following a deal reached with shareholders to go private.

In April, 2021, Harvard University announced that Foulkes would become president of the Harvard Board of Overseers, an alumni group that is the University’s second-highest governing body.

On October 13, 2021 Foulkes announced her candidacy for Governor of Rhode Island. WPRI reports that "she would seek to spur job growth, reduce regulations, deal with the effects of climate change, and improve public education."

Personal life
Foulkes has four children and runs marathons. In 2009 her mother died from lung cancer. She is a granddaughter of Thomas J. Dodd and a niece of Chris Dodd, both former U.S. senators from Connecticut.

References

External links

Campaign website

1964 births
21st-century American women
American women chief executives
Harvard Business School alumni
Goldman Sachs people
Living people
Rhode Island Democrats